Uttar Pradesh, the most populous state in India, has 75 districts. These districts, most of which have populations above 12 lakhs, and are grouped into 18 divisions for administrative convenience.

Division wise listing of districts

Area-wise listing of districts

Demand for new Districts 
Uttar Pradesh Cabinet Minister and MLA from Aonla, Dharampal Singh demanded new Aonla District to be carved out of Bareilly District.

See also
 Divisions of Uttar Pradesh
 List of RTO districts in Uttar Pradesh
 List of urban local bodies in Uttar Pradesh

References

 
Uttar Pradesh-related lists
Uttar Pradesh